Gangubai Harjeevandas, better known as Gangubai Kothewali or Gangubai Kathiawadi, was an Indian social activist, prostitute and madam of a brothel in the Kamathipura area of Mumbai during the 1960s. Gangubai worked for the rights of sex-workers and for the well-being of orphans. She gradually ended up operating her own brothel and is known to also have  lobbied for the rights of commercial sex workers.

Life 
She was sold into prostitution at an early age by her suitor, Ramnik Lal, after running away from home to Bombay. She came to be known as the Madam of Kamathipura for being an influential pimp in the city with underworld connections, peddling drugs. Later in life (presumably between 1947–64), she met Jawaharlal Nehru to discuss the plight of sex workers and improve their living conditions. But we have no solid proof for the story, as the journalist Pamban Mu Prasanth wrote in his article in BBC Tamil. 

Mafia Queens of Mumbai (2011) by Hussain Zaidi contains information on the lives of thirteen women who influenced Mumbai. In it, Zaidi also gives information about Gangubai. According to this, Gangubai was from a highly educated family and was obsessed with working in films and was a fan of Dev Anand. Gangubai, 16, and her husband Ramnik Lal, 28, fled to Mumbai and got married. Reluctantly, Gangubai started working as a prostitute. In a short time, Gangubai became the head of some kuntankhanas. A goon named Shaukat Khan Pathan started exploiting her financially and physically. Gangubai went to the then underworld don Karim Lala to complain about Pathan. Lala assured her of help and was tied a rakhi in return. After this, Shaukat Khan was warned and roughed-up by Lala.

Since then, Gangubai's repute as Karim Lala's supposed sister grew during the 1960s. St. Anthony's Girls' High School, which was established in Kamathipura in 1922, started a campaign to clean up the area of "bad influence". This led to an order to move the brothel. Gangubai vehemently opposed this and effectively presented her case to the then Prime Minister Jawaharlal Nehru and as a result, the brothel was not moved.

During this time Gangubai was also working for various issues of orphans and women in the prostitution business. Gangubai counseled and sent back many young women, who had fled their homes for working in films and got stuck in prostitution. For this reason, everyone used to respectfully call Gangubai Ganga Maa (mother). After her death, her photographs and statues were erected in brothels of the area.

In popular culture 
Her life was documented in the 2011 book, Mafia Queens of Mumbai, by writer and investigative journalist Hussain Zaidi.

The 2022 Indian Hindi-language film Gangubai Kathiawadi is based on the life of Gangubai Kothewali and a chapter of Zaidi's book, and directed by Sanjay Leela Bhansali with actress Alia Bhatt playing the titular character.

Notes

References 

Indian sex workers
20th-century Indian people
Indian female prostitutes
People from Mumbai
20th-century Indian women
1939 births
1977 deaths
Pimps